Walter Bowie (October 15, 1748 – November 9, 1810) was an American slave owner and politician.

Biography
Born in Mattaponi, near Nottingham, Prince George's County, Maryland, Bowie attended Reverend John Eversfield's School near Nottingham, the common schools in Annapolis, and Craddock’s School near Baltimore. His father, Captain William Bowie bought him a large farm near Collington, Maryland, known originally as "Darnell's Grove" and later as "Locust Grove" and "Willow Grove". He engaged in agricultural pursuits, was a large landowner, and also was interested in shipping. He served as one of four members of the Maryland constitutional convention from Prince George's County in November 1776.

During the American Revolutionary War, Bowie served as captain and later major of a Prince George's County company. He was a member of the Maryland House of Delegates from 1780 to 1800 and served in the Maryland State Senate from 1800 to 1802. He was elected as a Republican to the 7th United States Congress to fill the vacancy caused by the resignation of Richard Sprigg, Jr., was reelected to the 8th United States Congress, and served from March 24, 1802 to March 3, 1805. He declined to be a candidate for renomination in 1804 to the 9th United States Congress, and died near Collington in Prince George's County. He is interred in the family burying ground on his estate.

See also
 Colonial families of Maryland

References

Further reading

External links
 Retrieved on 2009-05-27

1748 births
1810 deaths
Bowie family
Maryland state senators
Maryland militiamen in the American Revolution
People of Maryland in the American Revolution
Democratic-Republican Party members of the United States House of Representatives from Maryland
People from Prince George's County, Maryland
People of colonial Maryland